The Poor Law Amendment Act 1834 and its administration entailed the creation of entirely new administrative areas throughout the United Kingdom: groups of parishes known as 
Poor Law Unions or simply Unions.

(Parish here = civil parish, defined as "area[s] for which a poor rate is or can be assessed" in mid-19th century legislation, as for example the Poor Law Amendment Act 1866; the thing is of course older than the term).

These groupings were based on geographical and demographic practicalities and took little account of most previous administrative arrangements, even cutting across county boundaries if necessary. By doing so there were created new Poor Law Counties, so called, in regard to the Poor Law itself, and other administrative functions, such as the decennial census, which used the Union boundaries. Note below, for example, Bourton and Silton, which although in Dorset, were for decades in the Wiltshire Union of Mere, and thus the Poor Law County of Wiltshire; the Somerset parishes in Sherborne Union, and thus in the Poor Law County of Dorset; and Lyme Regis, in Axminster Union and the Poor Law County of Devon.

In Dorset, however, the 1834 Unions were closely related to the pre-existing divisions (a unit developed principally for tax purposes), updated as recently as 1830 in a local Act of Parliament. See List of divisions in Dorset.

The Unions once established were used as the basis for subsequent administrative changes: they were taken from 1837 as the civil registration districts, and also as the basis for the sanitary districts introduced in the 1870s (see List of sanitary districts in Dorset).

Unions in Dorset and the civil parishes contained in each

Beaminster Union
Dorset:
Beaminster, Bettiscombe, Broadwindsor, Burstock
Chedington, Corscombe
East Chelborough, Evershot
Halstock, Hooke
Mapperton, Marshwood, Melbury Osmond, Melbury Sampford, Mosterton
Netherbury, North Poorton
Pilsdon, Powerstock
Rampisham
South Perrott, Stoke Abbott
West Chelborough, Wraxall
Somerset:
Misterton (transferred to Chard PLU 1896)
Seaborough (transferred to Dorset 1895)
Devon:
Thorncombe (transferred from Axminster PLU 1894; transferred to Devon 1844 and back to Dorset 1896)

Blandford Union
Almer (transferred to Wimborne PLU 1894), Anderson
Blandford Forum, Blandford St Mary, Bryanston
Charlton Marshall
Durweston
Hilton
Iwerne Courtney, Iwerne Stepleton
Langton Long Blandford
Milborne St Andrew, Milborne Stileham, Milton Abbas
Pimperne
Spetisbury, Stourpaine
Tarrant Crawford, Tarrant Gunville, Tarrant Hinton, Tarrant Keyneston, Tarrant Launceston, Tarrant Monkton, Tarrant Rawston, Tarrant Rushton, Turnworth
Winterborne Clenston, Winterborne Houghton, Winterborne Kingston, Winterborne Stickland, Winterborne Tomson, Winterborne Whitchurch, Winterborne Zelston
Later Additions:
Chettle (transferred from Wimborne PLU 1894); Farnham (transferred from Wimborne PLU 1894)

Bridport Union
Allington, Askerswell
Bothenhampton, Bradpole, Bridport, Burton Bradstock
Catherston Leweston, Chideock, Chilcombe
Litton Cheney, Loders
Puncknowle
Shipton Gorge, Stanton St Gabriel, Swyre, Symondsbury
Walditch, Whitchurch Canonicorum, Wootton Fitzpaine
Later Additions:
Charmouth (transferred from Axminster PLU 1896)

Cerne Union
Alton Pancras
Batcombe, Buckland Newton
Cattistock, Cerne Abbas, Cheselbourne, West Compton
Frome St Quintin
Glanvilles Wootton, Godmanstone, Gorewood
Hermitage, Hilfield
Mappowder, Melbury Bubb, Melcombe Horsey, Minterne Magna
Nether Cerne
Piddletrenthide, Pulham
Sydling St Nicholas
Up Cerne

Cranborne, see Wimborne

Dorchester Union
Athelhampton
Bradford Peverell, Broadmayne, Burleston
Charminster, Chilfrome, Compton Valence
Dewlish, Dorchester (All Saints, Holy Trinity, St Peter)
Fordington, Frampton, Frome Vauchurch
Kingston Russell
Littlebredy, Long Bredy
Maiden Newton
Piddlehinton, Puddletown
Stinsford, Stratton
Tincleton, Toller Fratrum, Toller Porcorum, Tolpuddle
Warmwell, West Knighton, West Stafford, Whitcombe, Winterborne Came, Winterborne Herringston, Winterborne Monkton, Winterborne St Martin, Winterbourne Abbas, Winterbourne Steepleton, Woodsford, Wynford Eagle
Later Additions:
Watercombe (from 1862)

Poole Union
Canford Magna
Hamworthy
Kinson
Longfleet, Lytchett Matravers, Lytchett Minster
Parkstone, Poole (Poole St James)
Later Additions:
Branksome (from 1894)

Purbeck, see Wareham

Shaftesbury Union
Ashmore
Cann, Compton Abbas
East Orchard, East Stour
Fontmell Magna
Gillingham
Iwerne Minster
Margaret Marsh, Melbury Abbas, Motcombe
Shaftesbury (Holy Trinity, St James, St Peter), Stour Provost, Sutton Waldron
Todber
West Orchard, West Stour
Later Additions (all in 1894):
Alcester (created from Shaftesbury); Bourton and Silton (transferred from Mere PLU); Buckhorn Weston and Kington Magna (transferred from Wincanton PLU)

Sherborne Union
Dorset:
Beer Hackett, Bishops Caundle, Bradford Abbas
Castleton, Caundle Marsh, Chetnole, Clifton Maybank
Folke
Haydon, Holnest
Leigh, Leweston, Lillington, Longburton
Nether Compton, North Wootton
Oborne, Over Compton
Purse Caundle
Ryme Intrinseca
Sherborne, Stockwood
Thornford
Yetminster
Somerset:
Holwell (transferred to Dorset 1844)
Goathill, Poyntington, Sandford Orcas, Trent (all transferred to Dorset 1895)
Marston Magna (transferred to Yeovil PLU 1894)
Rimpton (transferred to Yeovil PLU 1896)

Sturminster Union
Belchalwell (divided between Fifehead Neville and Okeford Fitzpaine 1884)
Child Okeford
Fifehead Magdalen, Fifehead Neville
Hammoon, Hazelbury Bryan, Hinton St Mary
Ibberton
Lydlinch
Manston, Marnhull
Okeford Fitzpaine
Shillingstone, Stalbridge, Stock Gaylard, Stoke Wake, Stourton Caundle, Sturminster Newton
Woolland
Later Addition:
Hanford (from 1858)

Wareham & Purbeck Union
Separate Poor Law Unions for Wareham and for Purbeck were formed 25 March 1836, but were merged into a single Wareham & Purbeck Union in September 1836.

The original Wareham Union
Affpuddle, Arne
Bere Regis, Bloxworth
Chaldon Herring, Coombe Keynes
East Holme, East Lulworth, East Stoke
Morden, Moreton
Turners Puddle
Wareham (Holy Trinity, Lady St Mary, St Martin), West Lulworth, Winfrith Newburgh, Wool
The original Purbeck Union
Church Knowle, Corfe Castle
Kimmeridge
Langton Matravers
Steeple, Studland, Swanage
Tyneham
Worth Matravers

Weymouth Union
Abbotsbury
Bincombe, Broadwey, Buckland Ripers
Fleet
Langton Herring
Melcombe Regis
Osmington, Owermoigne
Portesham, Portland, Preston, Poxwell
Radipole
Upwey
West Chickerell, Weymouth, Wyke Regis

Wimborne & Cranborne Union
Separate Poor Law Unions for Wimborne and for Cranborne were formed on 28 September and 30 September 1835 respectively, but were merged into a single Wimborne & Cranborne Union in October 1836.

The original Wimborne Union
Chalbury, Corfe Mullen
Hampreston, Hinton Martell, Hinton Parva
Shapwick, Sturminster Marshall
West Parley, Wimborne Minster, Witchampton
The original Cranborne Union
Chettle (moved to Blandford PLU 1894), Cranborne
Edmondsham
Farnham (moved to Blandford PLU 1894)
Gussage All Saints, Gussage St Michael
Horton
Long Crichel
Moor Crichel
Pentridge
Sixpenny Handley
Tollard Royal
Wimborne St Giles, Woodlands
Later additions:
East Woodyates and West Woodyates (created 1858)
Almer (transferred from Blandford PLU 1894)
Alderholt and Verwood (created from Cranborne 1894)
Holt and Pamphill (created from Wimborne Minster from 1894)
Colehill (created from Holt 1896)

Unions in other Poor Law counties containing Dorset civil parishes

Axminster Union
(in Devon)
Chardstock
Charmouth (1836–94)
Hawkchurch
Lyme Regis
Thorncombe (1836–94)

Chard Union
(in Somerset)
Wambrook

Mere Union
(in Wiltshire)
Bourton (1835–94)
Silton (1835–94)

Wincanton Union
(in Somerset)
Buckhorn Weston (1835–94)
Kington Magna (1835–94)

References and sources
Boswell, Edward, 1833: The Civil Division of the County of Dorset (published on CD by Archive CD Books Ltd, 1992)
Hutchins, John, History of Dorset, vols 1-4 (3rd ed 1861-70; reprinted by EP Publishing, Wakefield, 1973)
Mills, A. D., 1977, 1980, 1989: Place Names of Dorset, parts 1-3. English Place Name Society: Survey of English Place Names vols LII, LIII and 59/60

External links
Workhouse Site

Dorset
L
Poor law unions